Luke Lungile Pato  is a South African Anglican bishop. He has been bishop of Namibia since 2016 until 2021.

Pato has served as principal of the College of the Transfiguration, as a provincial executive officer, and at parishes in South Africa and England.

Notes

21st-century Anglican Church of Southern Africa bishops
Anglican bishops of Namibia
Living people
Year of birth missing (living people)